The Air Legion is a 1929 aviation silent film about airmail produced and distributed by Film Booking Offices of America(FBO) and was released just as FBO was being turned into RKO Pictures. In Canada, the film was distributed by the Alliance Communications Corporation. Aviation historian Michael Paris considered the film as "virtually the last silent film" on the topic of airmail flying.

Bert Glennon, a director and cinematographer, directed the film. The Air Legion stars Antonio Moreno, Ben Lyon and Martha Sleeper.

Plot
Airmail pilot Steve Rogers (Antonio Moreno) mentors young Dave Grayson (Ben Lyon), the son of Steve's late commander in the United States Army Air Corps. On his first flight, Dave flies into a raging storm and crashes.

Thinking of himself a coward after the rough flight, Dave seeks to redeem himself. Steve covers for him and campaigns for Dave getting another chance but he again fails. In a vain attempt to avoid flying supplies to the victims of a tornado, Dave attempts to shoot himself in the leg.

With Steve's help, Dave regains his courage, later saving Steve's life. Dave wins the love of Steve's girl, Sally (Martha Sleeper), and Steve gives them his blessing.

Cast

 Antonio Moreno as Steve Rogers
 Ben Lyon as Dave Grayson
 Martha Sleeper as Sally
 John Gough as McGonigle
 Colin Chase as Field Manager

Reception
Aviation film historian James H. Farmer in Celluloid Wings: The Impact of Movies on Aviation (1984) characterized The Air Legion as a "superior film of the period" with "refreshingly credible elements."

Aviation film historian Stephen Pendo, however, considered it a minor film, but yet an accurate example of the true dangers of flying the airmail. After a spate of aviation films that focused on aerial robbery as the main impediment, The Air Legion centered on the true issue, flying in inclement weather that threatened the safe delivery of airmail.

The Air Legion is preserved in London at the Cinema Museum.

References

Notes

Citations

Bibliography

 Farmer, James H. Celluloid Wings: The Impact of Movies on Aviation (1st ed.). Blue Ridge Summit, Pennsylvania: TAB Books 1984. .
 Paris, Michael. From the Wright Brothers to Top gun: Aviation, Nationalism, and Popular Cinema. Manchester, UK: Manchester University Press, 1995. .
 Pendo, Stephen. Aviation in the Cinema. Lanham, Maryland: Scarecrow Press, 1985. .

External links
 
 
 
 lobby poster

1929 films
American aviation films
American silent feature films
Film Booking Offices of America films
American black-and-white films
Films directed by Bert Glennon
1920s American films